The Best of the Original Dubliners is an album by Irish band The Dubliners which charted at No. 69 in Ireland on 17 March 2005. This three CD compilation contains Irish folk songs recorded by Ronnie Drew, Luke Kelly, Barney McKenna, Ciarán Bourke, and John Sheahan between 1967 and 1972. It includes the Dubliner's number one hit, "Seven Drunken Nights", as well as many of their best known songs.

Track list
Disc 1

 Seven Drunken Nights 
 The Black Velvet Band
 Whiskey In The Jar 
 All For Me Grog 
 Rising Of The Moon   
 I Wish I Were Back In Liverpool 
 The Bonny Boy 
 The Fairmoye Lasses And Sporting Paddy (Instrumental) 
 Maid Of The Sweet Brown Knowe   
 Molly Maguires  
 McAlpine's Fusiliers
 Greenland Whale Fishery  
 Biddy Mulligan  
 Musical Priest/Blackthorn Stick  
 Navvy Boots 
 Champion At Keeping Them Rolling   
 I Know My Love

Disc 2

 I'm A Rover  
 Maids When You're Young Never Wed An Old Man  
 Nancy Whiskey 
 A Pub With No Beer 
 Seven Deadly Sins 
 Black Velvet Band (live)
 A Nation Once Again 
 The Parting Glass 
 Paddy on the Railway  
 Kelly the Boy from Killan
 Lowlands of Holland
 The Breeze  
 Alabama 58   
 The Night Visiting Song 
 Cork Hornpipe 
 Dicey Rilley
 Whiskey On A Sunday

Disc 3

 Dirty Old Town   
 Whiskey In The Jar  
 The Auld Triangle 
 The Galway Races 
 Peggy Gordon   
 The Irish Navy 
 Net Hauling Song  
 The Battle Of The Somme/Freedom Come All Ye
 Smith Of Bristol 
 Tibby Dunbar 
 The Leavin' Of Liverpool
 The Beggar Man 
 Rattling Roaring Willie 
 School Days Over
 Louse-House In Kilkenny 
 Mrs. McGrath 
 Seven Drunken Nights (live)

References

External links
Amazon.co.uk

The Dubliners compilation albums
2003 compilation albums